The Blessed and the Damned is a double CD best of compilation album by the American heavy metal band Iced Earth. The CD-booklet can be reversed, to show either angels or demons on the cover. The booklet also includes Jon Schaffer's comments on previous albums and his life. Even though the CD was released after The Glorious Burden, the biography in the booklet makes no mention of it. This is probably because Iced Earth left their record label Century Media Records prior to The Glorious Burden, and signed with SPV. In turn, Century Media released this compilation album.

Track listing

Disc 1

Disc 2

Personnel

 Jon Schaffer − rhythm guitar, backing vocals on all songs. vocals on track 6 on disc 1
 Matt Barlow − vocals on tracks 1-3, 5, 7-9, and 11 on disc 1; tracks 1-5, 7-10, and 12 on disc 2
 Gene Adam − vocals on tracks 4 and 10 on disc 1; track 11 on disc 2
 John Greely − vocals on track 6 on disc 2
 Randall Shawver − lead guitar on tracks 3-4, 6-7, and 9-10 on disc 1; tracks 1-3, 6-7, 9, and 11 on disc 2
 Larry Tarnowski − lead guitar on tracks 1-2, 5, 8, and 11 on disc 1; tracks 4-5, 8, 10, and 12 on disc 2
 Dave Abell − bass on tracks 3-4, 6-7, and 9-10 on disc 1; tracks 3, 6-7, and 11 on disc 2
 James MacDonough − bass on tracks 1, 5, and 8 on disc 1; tracks 1, 2, 4-5, 8, 9 and 12 on disc 2
 Steve Di Giorgio − bass on tracks 2 and 11 on disc 1, and track 10 on disc 2
 Mark Prator − drums on tracks  3 and 9 on disc 1; track 7 on disc 2
 Richey Secchiari − drums on track 6 on disc 1; track 6 on disc 2
 Mike McGill − drums on tracks 4 and 10 on disc 1; track 11 on disc 2
 Richard Christy − drums on tracks 2 and 11 on disc 1; track 10 on disc 2
 Brent Smedley − drums on tracks 1, 5, and 8 on disc 1; tracks 1, 2, 4, 5, 8, 9, and 12 on disc 2
 Rodney Beasley − drums on track 7 on disc 1; track 3 on disc 2
 Leo Hao – cover art

2004 greatest hits albums
Iced Earth compilation albums